Vladislav Dmitriyevich Sitnichenko (born 12 February 1998) is a Russian football player.

He made his debut in the Russian Football National League for FC Baikal Irkutsk on 12 March 2016 in a game against FC Yenisey Krasnoyarsk.

References

External links
 Profile by Russian Football National League

1998 births
Living people
Russian footballers
Place of birth missing (living people)
Association football midfielders
FC Baikal Irkutsk players